Claude Smith (1891-1931), American politician, Arizona State Senator
Claude T. Smith {1932 – 1987), American band leader